Oswego  is a village in Kendall and Will Counties, Illinois, United States. Per the 2020 census, the population was 34,485. Oswego is the largest municipality in Kendall County. It is a suburb of Chicago, Illinois.

History

In 1833, William Smith Wilson, his wife Rebecca, and his brother-in-law Daniel Pearce moved to the area now known as Oswego. The land belonged to the local Potawatomi, Ottawa, and Chippewa tribes, but the United States government removed the Native Americans when the government started surveying the land along the Fox River in Kendall County. In 1842, the federal government placed the land for sale at an established price of $1.25 an acre.

After the sale of the land, Lewis Brinsmaid Judson and Levi F. Arnold from New York laid out the village and named it "Hudson". However, when a post office was established, its location was given as "Lodi". Confusion over the official name of the area led to a decision in January 1837, when the citizens gathered and voted "Oswego" as the permanent name of the village by a single vote. The village was named after Oswego, New York, an Iroquois word meaning "mouth of the stream". The ford across the Fox River in the town allowed Oswego to grow economically and as a town, eventually incorporated in 1852 with its village boundaries at the time being Harrison Street to the northwest, Jefferson Street to the northeast, Monroe Street to the southeast, and Benton Street to the southwest. At the advent of the automobile, Oswego continued to see growth as it became a hub for three different state highways (Illinois Route 25, Illinois Route 71, and Illinois Route 31).

Major community developments began when Caterpillar Inc. and Western Electric built industrial plants near Oswego in the mid-1950s. This initially allowed nearby Boulder Hill to develop. The next major development arrived in the mid-1980s during the suburban homebuilding boom, which allowed houses and buildings to populate the village. The rapid growth of the village allowed its limits to expand west of the Fox River into today's boundaries.

Oswego is known to some Chicago-area residents for the town dragstrip on State Route 34, which was open from 1955 until 1979, where muscle cars were raced by drivers from all over the Midwest. The drag days are still celebrated even though the strip has been closed for decades. Although evidence of the drag strip, including parts of the track, still remain, the site is off limits to the public.

Geography
Oswego is located in northeastern Kendall County on the Fox River with a small portion in Will County. It is bordered to the north by Boulder Hill and Montgomery, to the east by Aurora, and to the west by Yorkville, the Kendall county seat.

Downtown
Downtown Oswego is home to historic buildings and homes, as well as shops and restaurants. The Village of Oswego launched a project to enhance and restore the historic downtown district. This project included significant infrastructure and streetscape improvements, such as the installation of brick pavers, sidewalks, landscaping, and decorative streetlights and benches. Hudson Crossing Park, located along the Fox River, opened in October 2004 where many children and families enjoy the scenery. The Waubonsee Creek Promenade, which stretches from Main Street to the new park, is the final phase of the downtown enhancements. In 2008, the village celebrated its 175th anniversary.

Recreation and leisure
Established in 1950, this governmental agency is guided to "create opportunities for a healthy community". Overseeing 63 parks,  of walking trails, two aquatic parks, and the Little White School Museum, the park district provides offerings for the community of 20,000 households as well as visitors from farther away.

The Oswego area holds several races for fitness enthusiasts. Several area festivals are coordinated by the park district, such as the annual PrairieFest.

Demographics

2020 census

Note: the US Census treats Hispanic/Latino as an ethnic category. This table excludes Latinos from the racial categories and assigns them to a separate category. Hispanics/Latinos can be of any race.

2019 American Community Survey
As of the census of 2019, there were 36,252 people, 11,215 families living in the village. The population density was 2,025/mi2 (782/km2).  There were 10,388 housing units at an urban density of 668.9/mi2 (258.3/km2). The racial makeup of the village was 82.0% White, 5.6% African American, 0.24% Native American, 4.79% Asian, 0.03% Pacific Islander, 3.24% from other races, and 2.24% from two or more races. 17.1% of the population were Hispanic or Latino of any race.

There were 9,935 households, out of which 50.3% had children under the age of 18 living with them, 69.2% were married couples living together, 10.58% had a female householder with no husband present, and 19.2% were non-families. The average household size was 3.08 and the average family size was 3.43.

In the village, the population was spread out, with 34.7% under the age of 20, 17.0% from 20 to 34, 33.2% from 35 to 54, 8.3% from 55 to 64, and 6.8% who were 65 years of age or older.  The median age was 33.9 years.

As of the 2019 census, the median income for a household in the village was $117,624, and the median income for a family was $102,110. Males had a median income of $75,849 versus $56,164 for females. The per capita income for the village was $37,839. 1.49% of the population and 1% of families were below the poverty line.  Out of the total population, 1.49% of those under the age of 18 and 1.56% of those 65 and older were living below the poverty line.

Education
The Oswego Community Unit School District 308 serves Oswego, Boulder Hill, Montgomery, Plainfield, Aurora, Yorkville and Joliet. It operates 22 schools, including one early learning center, 14 elementary schools for grades K-5, 5 junior high schools for grades 6-8, 2 high schools, and one opportunity school. Portions of Oswego are within Yorkville Community Unit School District 115, which operates Yorkville High School.

Notable people 

 Rob Baxley, former professional football player
 Arthur M. Beaupre, diplomat; born in Oswego
 Tom Cross, former member of the Illinois House of Representatives
 Slade Cutter, former naval officer and member of the College Football Hall of Fame
 Rita B. Garman, current Chief Justice of the Supreme Court of Illinois
 Joey Goodspeed, former professional football player; running back for the Minnesota Vikings, St. Louis Rams, and San Diego Chargers
 John Hamilton, member of the John Dillinger gang who was buried near here in summer of 1934
 J. Dennis Hastert, former Congressman and Speaker of the United States House of Representatives (1999–2007), convicted child molester
 Alex Magee, former professional football player; defensive end for the Kansas City Chiefs and Tampa Bay Buccaneers
 Robert Mitchler, Illinois state senator
 Robinson B. Murphy, Civil War Army musician; Medal of Honor recipient
 Maud N. Peffers, Illinois state representative
 Tom Sharpe, drummer for Mannheim Steamroller as well as Dennis DeYoung
 Julianne Sitch, former professional soccer player. First woman to ever win an NCAA championship as coach of a men’s team
 Keith R. Wheeler, member of the Illinois General Assembly

Awards and recognition
Oswego was ranked #58 in 2011 on CNN/Money Magazine’s Top 100 Best Towns to live.  CNN Money ranks these towns based on their job opportunities, schools, safety, economic strength, and other qualities. Kendall County has continuously been ranked as one of the fastest-growing counties and a place of rapid job growth.

Gallery

References

External links

 
Villages in Kendall County, Illinois
Villages in Will County, Illinois
Populated places established in 1833
1833 establishments in Illinois